Triplopogon is a genus of plants in the grass family. The only known species is Triplopogon ramosissimus, native to Maharashtra, India.

References

Andropogoneae
Monotypic Poaceae genera
Endemic flora of India (region)
Grasses of India
Flora of Maharashtra
Taxa named by Eduard Hackel